Baijiantan District is a district of the city of Karamay in the Xinjiang Uyghur Autonomous Region. According to the 2002 census, it has a population of 60,000.

Transport
China National Highway 217

County-level divisions of Xinjiang